Simoi Peri is a Malaysian politician serving in the Sarawak State Legislative Assembly.

Prior to being elected, she worked at the State Islamic Department. In 2006, she joined the Parti Pesaka Bumiputera Bersatu (PBB). She defeated Abang Othman Abang Gom of the People's Justice Party to win the Lingga seat in the state assembly. In March 2011, Peri announced that she would not run for reelection. However, she was subsequently re-nominated and ran for reelection at the request of the leadership of the Barisan Nasional party. Peri was re-elected in 2011 and in 2016.

She also served as chief of PBB Lingga and as a member of the Supreme Council of the Women's Wing of PBB Sarawak.

References 

Date of birth missing (living people)
Women MLAs in Sarawak
Living people
Parti Pesaka Bumiputera Bersatu politicians
Year of birth missing (living people)